Urban Christian fiction is a subgenre of Christian fiction and urban fiction in which conflicting stories of emotion and vividness mixes God, the urban church, and faith. Violence and sex is not purposely excluded, but are included whenever necessary for the story line. God is the center of the characters' lives in Urban Christian fiction, and these stories usually portray African-American or Latino urban culture. Urban Christian fiction is classified as part of the African-American Christian Market (AACM), where the hot-selling topics are fiction, books for dating, dramatic testimony, and single parenting. Some of the themes and topics considered within Urban Christian fiction cross over into theological fiction.

References

Christian literary genres
Urban fiction
 Urban
African-American literature